The Matériel Articulé (MA), also known as the MA 51, was a type of rolling stock on the Paris Métro and was in service between 1951 and 1994.

Conception
The MA 51 rolling stock was a result of research conducted by the Compagnie du chemin de fer métropolitain de Paris (CMP) and the Régie Autonome des Transports Parisiens (RATP) during the 1940 in response to the then-used Sprague-Thomson rolling stock being considered heavy and outdated. The company envisioned a rolling stock that was lighter and equipped with a Jeumon-Heidmann (JH) system that had been used on the Sceaux Line since 1938. In addition, the company hoped to improve braking. The most-used solution at the time was a rolling stock with a common bogie between two cars.

At the same time, the company also desired to have circulating modular trains so that they may have been expanded during peak hours. Lines equipped with stations of at least  supported trains with two trainsets and those with stations of at least  supported trains with three trainsets. An extension of stations to  that began in 1931 was never completed.

Description

Each trainset consisted of three body sections resting on four bogies. The central section was shorter than the rest and in 1952 was designated as a first class car. The trainset were equipped with Scharfenberg automatic couplings allowing for quick coupling and uncoupling of trainsets.

Seats were divided into two classes, and fluorescent lighting was used. Folding seats were used at each end to increase the number of seats for passengers.

Initially, the livery was grayish-blue across all cars, however with the introduction of first class in the 1950s, the RATP piloted  first class cars in the middle colored red, however this did not catch on. RATP eventually incorporated yellow into the color scheme, between gray and blue bands. The livery on second class cars was gray and blue and was yellow on first class cars.

The model is unusual in that the driving cab could double as passenger accommodation. A door existed which, when opened, allowed access to the control panel. A folding seat was attached to the side of the door, allowing for the conductor to be seated. When the door was closed, it hid the control panel allowing for additional space for passengers.

MA on Line 13
RATP decided to place the MA on Paris Métro Line 13, a forked line whose branches were poorly serviced during off-peak hours and which also had a terminus newly adapted to the MA model of rolling stock.  Trains circulated with two coupled trainsets during peak hours and single trainsets during off-peak hours.

Ordered late, the MA51 arrived on line 13 in 1952, and allowed for the extension of the line from Porte de Saint-Ouen to Carrefour Pleyel.

The MA rolling stock was as loud as the Sprague rolling stock. It was equipped with a modulated pneumatic braking system that was judged acceptable in 1952 but later declared outdated in the 1960s. The RATP lost interest in using only pneumatic braking on cars and as a result the MP 51  was put in service.

Decoupling was abandoned in 1972. The MA continued during the expansions to Champs-Élysées but was later transferred to Line 10.

MA on Line 10
Because the métro network still contained many Sprague-model stock in 1974, the RATP decided not to eliminate the MA but instead to modernize it and use it on a line experiencing only light traffic. As a result, the model was renovated and put in service on Line 10 with six cars permanently attached. A new dark-blue livery was applied similar to that of the MP 73.

First class was moved to a long body section and lighting followed that of the MP 73. The interior walls contained a blue tint adopted by the MP 73 as well as the new MF 67 E&F. During the 1980s, the door that hid the control panel was removed and the cabins were occupied only by RATP conductors. This resulted in the largest driving cabin of the network.

Unable to accommodate autopilot and equipped with brakes that were too delicate on iron tracks, the MA's replacement with newer-model rolling stock became inevitable. Replacement of the MA began in 1988 and was completed in 1994. They were replaced by MF 67 stock that were moved to Line 10 from Line 7bis (which were in-turn replaced by the MF 88). Two trainsets have been preserved - one by the RATP and the other by ADEMAS.

Paris Métro rolling stock